Electro Karaoke in the Negative Style is an album by Fujiya & Miyagi released in 2002.

Track listing
 "New Accounts Analysts"
 "Rot"
 "King Holer"
 "Simeone Slides"
 "Skinny Punk"
 "Tarr's White Collar"
 "Skeleton Phone Cover"
 "Uptight"
 "Diagrams"
 "Shake"
 "Electro Karaoke"
 "Lolalucamilla"

Fujiya & Miyagi albums